is a Japanese amateur astronomer who operates from his private Aoki Astronomical Observatory at Toyama, Toyama Prefecture, Japan.

His main interest lies in supernovae of which he has discovered a total of 13, such a SN 1999eu as well as SN 2000db and SN 2000di. In 2016, he discovered the supernova SN 2016C in NGC 5247. In the course of his search, he has also discovered two asteroids during 1996–1997. He has named the asteroid 58627 Rieko in honour of his wife.

References

External links 
 Aoki's home page
 Masakatsu Aoki – Profile

Discoverers of asteroids

20th-century Japanese astronomers
Living people
Year of birth missing (living people)